McAuley High School is a Catholic girls' secondary school in Ōtāhuhu, New Zealand. The school was founded by the Sisters of Mercy in 1962 and continues to be run by the order.

Students at the school achieve highly compared to the national average and to students at schools with a similar decile rating. Attendance figures are very high compared to most low decile schools because the principal gives this a very high priority. Regular attendance at school is a constant message that is backed up by the local catholic church which stands at over 90%.

In 2016 the school was awarded with both Excellence in Engaging and Education Supreme Awards by the Prime Minister of New Zealand.

Notable alumnae
Annette Presley - businessperson and founder of Slingshot
Anne Frances Audain née Garrett MBE.  Competed in three Olympic Games and four Commonwealth Games.  Gold Medalist at Brisbane Commonwealth Games.
Josephine Bartley - first Pacific woman to be elected to Auckland Council governing body.

References

External links
School website

Educational institutions established in 1962
Girls' schools in New Zealand
Catholic secondary schools in Auckland
1962 establishments in New Zealand
Sisters of Mercy schools